is an athletic stadium in Yamaguchi, Yamaguchi, Japan. It was formerly known as Ishin Memorial Park Stadium after the Ishin (Restoration, meaning the Meiji Restoration in which the Choshu Domain played a large part). Since January 2018 it has been called Ishin Me-Life Stadium for the naming rights.

The stadium is opened for 18th National Sports Festival of Japan in 1963, and renovated for 66th National Sports Festival of Japan in 2011.

The stadium is home to the professional football team Renofa Yamaguchi FC.

External links 
  

Football venues in Japan
Sports venues in Yamaguchi Prefecture
Athletics (track and field) venues in Japan
Yamaguchi (city)
Multi-purpose stadiums in Japan
Renofa Yamaguchi FC
Sports venues completed in 1963
1963 establishments in Japan